Royal Boskalis Westminster N.V. is a Dutch dredging and heavylift company that provides services relating to the construction and maintenance of maritime infrastructure internationally. The company has one of the world's largest dredging fleets, a large stake in Smit International and owns Dockwise, a large heavylift shipping company.

As of 2020, Boskalis employs around 9,900 employees and 650 ships. They operate in over 75 countries in six continents.

History
Boskalis (Bos & Kalis) was founded as Johannes Kraaijeveld en van Noordenne in 1910 by Johannes Kraaijeveld and Eliza van Noordenne. In the thirties it was renamed NV Baggermaatschappij Bos & Kalis when Gerrit Jan Bos, Wilhelm Bos, Egbertus Dingeman Kalis and Kobus Kalis took over. In between the two wars, Boskalis contributed to the Zuiderzee project. The company inked a contract in 1931 for the dredging of Bromborough Dock. In 1933, Boskalis partnered with the Westminster Dredging Company (based in Fareham, England), which opened business opportunities with West Africa.

Listing, developments 1970 to 2000
Boskalis became a public company in 1970.  Boskalis received the designation "Royal" in 1978. In the 1980s economic and political circumstances forced Boskalis to concentrate on its core dredging business.

More acquisitions followed in the 1990s as the company acquired a 40% interest in Archirodon Group. During this period Boskalis was also involved in several major land reclamation projects. In Hong Kong the company worked on the major land reclamation project for the new Chek Lap Kok airport and in Singapore it cooperated on a multi-year development program.

Since 2000
In 2007 the company was engaged in two major contracts in Australia — a €300 million contract to deepen the shipping channels of Port Phillip in Melbourne, utilising its dredge the Queen of the Netherlands, and a €50 million contract to expand the harbour at Newcastle.  The company is also involved in a €1.1 billion contract to develop a new port in Abu Dhabi.

Purchase of Smit and Dockwise
On 15 September 2008 Boskalis offered €1.11 billion for fellow Dutch maritime company Smit International. Despite the offer being promptly rejected by Smit's board, Boskalis subsequently built a stake of over 25% in the firm and expressed a continuing desire to buy a number of its business units. A revised offer of €1.35 billion was accepted by Smit in January 2010, with Boskalis declaring its offer unconditional that March.

In 2011 Boskalis acquired MNO Vervat in The Netherlands. In 2013, Boskalis acquired Dockwise, a heavy marine transport company.

Suez Canal blockage
Two Boskalis tugboats helped the eleven Egyptian tugs in the dredging and towing operation to free the 400-metre long ship Ever Given, which ran aground in the Suez Canal on 23 March 2021, and got stuck diagonally and therefore blocked the Suez Canal from 23 till 29 March 2021 during which time the canal was impassable.
A traffic jam of around 400 ships was the result of the blockage of the canal.

Controversies
Boskalis has been informally accused of bribing Mauritian politicians to obtain the contract to dredge the Canal Anglais.

See also
 Shoalway
 Dockwise Vanguard

References

External links
 

Companies based in South Holland
Construction and civil engineering companies of the Netherlands
Multinational companies headquartered in the Netherlands
Dredging companies
Dutch brands
Papendrecht
Companies listed on Euronext Amsterdam
Construction and civil engineering companies  established in 1910
Dutch companies established in 1910